Praxilla of Sicyon, was a Greek lyric poet of the 5th century BC, from Sicyon on the Gulf of Corinth.  Eusebius dates her floruit to 451/450 BC (the second year of the 82nd Olympiad).

Little of Praxilla's work survives – five fragments in her own words, and three paraphrases by other authors.  These vary in style: three are skolia (drinking songs) one is a hymn to Adonis, and one is a dithyramb.  One of the skolia is in a metre named the Praxilleion after her.  The three works known only in paraphrase are all versions of myths.  In the second century AD, Athenaeus reports that Praxilla was particularly known for her skolia.

Praxilla was well regarded in antiquity.  Antipater of Thessalonica lists her first among his canon of nine "immortal-tongued" women poets, and the sculptor Lysippus (also from Sicyon) sculpted her in bronze.  She was sufficiently well-known in classical Athens that two of Aristophanes' surviving plays (The Wasps and Thesmophoriazusae) parody her work.  Her poetry was still remembered many centuries after her death: in the second century AD, her name was remembered in the proverb "sillier than Praxilla's Adonis", and the author Tatian cites her in his Address to the Greeks.

Because three of the works attributed to Praxilla are drinking songs, and respectable women in classical Greece would normally have been excluded from the parties where such songs were performed, there has been some scholarly debate about Praxila's social position.  Martin Litchfield West suggests that there were two Praxillas, one writing the skolia; the other, the more "respectable" choral songs and hymns.  Other scholars have argued that, based on the attribution of skolia to Praxilla, she must have been a hetaira (a type of prostitute), though Jane McIntosh Snyder notes that there is no external evidence for this thesis.  Ian Plant suggests the alternative hypothesis that she was a professional musician, composing songs for symposia because there was a market for such works.

Alternatively, West suggests that the skolia were not written by Praxilla at all.  Gregory Jones agrees, and argues that all of the surviving skolia attributed to particular poets are in fact derived from a non-elite oral literary tradition.  Marchinus Van der Valk, who also endorses this theory, allows for the possibility that some skolia were "derived from" Praxilla's poetry and published in antiquity attributed to her.

Praxilla was included in Judy Chicago's Heritage Floor.  One of her fragments was adapted by Michael Longley in his poem "Praxilla", from the 2004 collection Snow Water.

Notes

References

External links
 Project Continua: Biography of Praxilla Project Continua is a web-based multimedia resource dedicated to the creation and preservation of women’s intellectual history from the earliest surviving evidence into the 21st Century.

Ancient Sicyonians
Ancient Greek lyric poets
Dithyrambic poets
5th-century BC Greek people
5th-century BC poets
5th-century BC women writers
5th-century BC writers
Year of birth unknown
Year of death unknown
Ancient Greek women poets
5th-century BC Greek women